Roll-up or Roll Up may refer to:

Music
 "Roll Up" (Wiz Khalifa song), a song by American rapper Wiz Khalifa
 "Roll Up" (Emtee song), a song by South African rapper Emtee
 "Roll Up", a song by American band Fitz and the Tantrums from their self-titled album
 "Roll Up, Roll Up", a song by Streetwalkers from the album Red Card

Computing
 Roll-up keyboard, a keyboard that one can roll up into the shape of a cylinder
 Roll-away computer, a theoretical, flexible computer
 Roll-up, an OLAP data operation

Entertainment
 Star Wars Roll-up, a part of the opening sequence of films in the Star Wars franchise
 Roll-up, a type of pin in professional wrestling
 "Roll up", a phrase commonly used by British carnival barkers

Other
 Rollup, a tactic of investors who acquire and then merge similar small companies
 Fruit Roll-Ups, a fruit snack available in the United States of America and in Australia
 Roll-your-own cigarette, a hand-rolled cigarette
 Roll up blind, a type of window covering
 Roll up screen, a screen rolled up from a container and fastened on top of a stick; can be used in campaigning and marketing
 Another term for a wrap
 Roll Up banner, used during the Lambing Flat riots
Operation Roll-Up, a US refurbishing operation during the Korean War